The  is a small museum in Kamakura, Kanagawa, Japan, that contains material about writers who have lived, died, or were active in the city of Kamakura itself. The museum displays personal effects, manuscripts, first editions, and documents owned by well over a hundred writers of Japanese literature, including Natsume Sōseki and Kawabata Yasunari, as well as film director Yasujirō Ozu. The villa that hosts the museum, its large garden and its rose garden are also of great interest.

The plaque in front of the villa says:

Kamakura Museum of Literature (a villa of the old, noble Maeda family)

The house was erected in 1936 by Toshinari Maeda (前田利為), the 16th head of the Maeda family, (part of the Kaga clan). It stands half way up a hill in Kamakura, overlooking Sagami Bay. It represents the villa architecture of those days. Eisaku Satō, a former Prime Minister and Nobel Peace Prize winner, once made use of it as his villa. It also appeared in a scene from "Spring Snow", a novel by Yukio Mishima, a well-known novelist. It opened to the public as Kamakura Museum of Literature in November 1985. The Main Building of the Kamakura Museum of Literature was registered as a National Registered Tangible Property in April 2000.

Museum data 
 Access: 7 minutes on foot from Enoden's Yuigahama station or 3 minutes from the Kaigan Dōri stop of the bus from Kamakura station to Fujisawa
 Open: from 9 to 5 between March and September, from 9 to 16:30 the rest of the year
 Ticket price: 400 yen. Extra fee for special exhibitions
 Address: Kamakura Museum of Literature, Hase 1-5-3, 〒 248-0016 Kamakura, Kanagawa

References

External links 
 Kamakura Trip website "Kamakura Museum of Literature" page (in English)

Buildings and structures in Kamakura, Kanagawa
Museums established in 1985
Museums in Kanagawa Prefecture
Literary museums in Japan
Biographical museums in Japan
1985 establishments in Japan